City Paper may refer to:

The City Paper also known as The Nashville City Paper
Baltimore City Paper
Charleston City Paper
Columbia City Paper
Dayton City Paper
Philadelphia City Paper
Pittsburgh City Paper
Toledo City Paper
Washington City Paper

See also

 City News (disambiguation)
 City Journal
Tha City Paper, an American rapper